Memorial gates and arches are architectural monuments in the form of gates and arches or other entrances, constructed as a memorial, often dedicated to a particular war though some are dedicated to individuals. The function is similar to that of a triumphal arch, with the emphasis on remembrance and commemoration of war casualties, on marking a civil event (the country's independence, for example), or on providing a monumental entrance to a city, as opposed to celebrating a military success or general, though some memorial arches perform both functions. They can vary in size, but are commonly monumental stone structures combining features of both an archway and a gate, often forming an entrance or straddling a roadway, but sometimes constructed in isolation as a standalone structure, or on a smaller scale as a local memorial to war dead. Although they can share architectural features with triumphal arches, memorial arches and gates constructed from the 20th century onwards often have the names of the dead inscribed on them as an act of commemoration.

Memorial gates

Europe

Belgium
 Menin Gate, Ypres

Germany
 Brandenburg Gate, Berlin

United Kingdom
 University of Glasgow Memorial Gates, Glasgow
 Memorial Gates, London

North America

Canada
 Memorial Gates (University of Saskatchewan), Saskatoon
 Roddick Gates, Montreal

United States
 Hurlbut Memorial Gate, Detroit
 Confederate Memorial Gates in Mayfield
 Confederate Memorial Gateway in Hickman
 Soldiers Memorial Gate (Brown University)

Memorial arches

Asia

Afghanistan
 Taq-e Zafar (Arch of Victory) (1928), Paghman

India
 India Gate (1931), New Delhi
 Gateway of India (1924), Mumbai
 Sabhyata Dwar (2018), Patna

Iraq
 Swords of Qādisīyah (Victory Arch) (1989), Baghdad

Europe

Belgium
 Arcade du Cinquantenaire (1905), Brussels

France
 Thiepval Memorial (1932), Thiepval

Germany
 Siegestor (1850), Munich

Ireland
 Fusiliers' Arch (1907), Dublin

Italy
 Arco della Vittoria (1931), Genoa

North Macedonia
 Porta Macedonia (2012), Skopje

Portugal
 Rua Augusta Arch (1873), Lisbon

United Kingdom
 Arch of Remembrance (1925), WWI memorial in Leicester
 City War Memorial (1927), WWI memorial in Nottingham

North America

Canada
 Peace Arch (1921), Canada–US border
 National War Memorial (1939), Ottawa
 Royal Military College of Canada Memorial Arch, Kingston

Mexico
 Monumento a la Revolución (1938), Mexico City

United States
 Memorial Arch of Tilton (1882), Northfield, New Hampshire
 Soldiers and Sailors Memorial Arch (1886), Hartford, Connecticut
 Washington Square Arch (1892), Manhattan, New York City
 War Correspondents Memorial Arch (1896), Gathland State Park, Maryland
 Confederate Memorial (1902), Fulton, Kentucky
 Confederate Soldier Memorial (1902), Columbus, Ohio
 Smith Memorial Arch (1912), West Fairmount Park, Philadelphia, Pennsylvania
 Pennsylvania State Memorial, Gettysburg (1914), Pennsylvania
 National Memorial Arch (1917), Valley Forge, Pennsylvania
 Victory Arch (1919), Macarty Square, New Orleans, Louisiana
 Victory Gate (1919, razed 1920), Madison Square Park, Manhattan, New York City
 Rosedale World War I Memorial Arch (1924), Kansas City, Kansas
 Memorial Arch (1924), Huntington, West Virginia
 Gateway Arch (1965), St. Louis, Missouri

References

External links
Memorial Arch at Stanford University
List of Chinese memorial arches
Rugby's War Memorial Gates
News story about memorial gates in New Zealand
Example of an Australian memorial gate

Types of monuments and memorials
Gates
Arches and vaults